Bruno Roberto Pereira da Silva (born 27 April 2000), commonly known as Bruninho, is a Brazilian footballer who plays either as an attacking midfielder or a forward for Guarani, on loan from Atlético Mineiro.

Career statistics

Club

Notes

Honours
Atlético Mineiro
Campeonato Mineiro: 2020

References

2000 births
Living people
Footballers from Belo Horizonte
Brazilian footballers
Association football midfielders
Association football forwards
Campeonato Brasileiro Série A players
Campeonato Brasileiro Série B players
Clube Atlético Mineiro players
Sport Club do Recife players
Associação Desportiva Confiança players
Esporte Clube Juventude players
Clube de Regatas Brasil players
Guarani FC players